Julius Robert Katoi Kalu is a Kenyan Anglican Bishop. He is the current Bishop of Mombasa, having been consecrated and enthroned on January 2, 1994.

References

Anglican bishops of Mombasa
Year of birth missing (living people)
Living people
Kenyan Anglicans
Place of birth missing (living people)